The United States Geological Survey (USGS), formerly simply known as the Geological Survey, is a scientific agency of the United States government. The scientists of the USGS study the landscape of the United States, its natural resources, and the natural hazards that threaten it. The organization's work spans the disciplines of biology, geography, geology, and hydrology. The USGS is a fact-finding research organization with no regulatory responsibility. The agency was founded on March 3, 1879. It is now chaired by David Applegate.

The USGS is a bureau of the United States Department of the Interior; it is that department's sole scientific agency. The USGS employs approximately 8,670 people and is headquartered in Reston, Virginia. The USGS also has major offices near Lakewood, Colorado, at the Denver Federal Center, and Menlo Park, California.

The current motto of the USGS, in use since August 1997, is "science for a changing world". The agency's previous slogan, adopted on the occasion of its hundredth anniversary, was "Earth Science in the Public Service".

Organizational structure

Since 2012, the USGS science focus has been directed at topical "Mission Areas" that have continued to evolve iteratively over time. Further organizational structure includes headquarters functions, geographic regions, science and support programs, science centers, labs, and other facilities.

Regions 
The USGS regional organization aligns with the U.S. Department of the Interior Unified Interior Regions:

 Region 1: North Atlantic-Appalachian
 Region 2: South Atlantic-Gulf
 Region 3: Great Lakes
 Region 4: Mississippi Basin
 Region 5: Missouri Basin
 Region 6: Arkansas-Rio Grande-Texas-Gulf
 Region 7: Upper Colorado Basin
 Region 8: Lower Colorado Basin
 Region 9: Columbia-Pacific Northwest
 Region 10: California-Great Basin
 Region 11: Alaska
 Region 12: Pacific Islands

Science programs, facilities, and other organizations 
USGS operates and organizes within a number of specific science programs, facilities, and other organizational units:

Earthquake Hazards Program 
The Earthquake Hazards Program monitors earthquake activity worldwide. The National Earthquake Information Center (NEIC) in Golden, Colorado, on the campus of the Colorado School of Mines detects the location and magnitude of global earthquakes. The USGS also runs or supports several regional monitoring networks in the United States under the umbrella of the Advanced National Seismic System (ANSS). The USGS informs authorities, emergency responders, the media, and the public, both domestic and worldwide, about significant earthquakes. It maintains long-term archives of earthquake data for scientific and engineering research. It also conducts and supports research on long-term seismic hazards. USGS has released the UCERF California earthquake forecast.

Volcano Early Warning Systems 
As of 2005, the agency is working to create a National Volcano Early Warning System by improving the instrumentation monitoring the 169 volcanoes in U.S. territory and by establishing methods for measuring the relative threats posed at each site.

Coastal and Marine Science Center 
The USGS Coastal and Marine Science Center (formerly the USGS Center for Coastal Geology) has three sites, one for the Atlantic Ocean (located in Woods Hole, Massachusetts), one for the Pacific Ocean (located in Santa Cruz, California) and one for the Gulf of Mexico (located on the University of South Florida's St. Petersburg campus). The goal of this department is to conduct research in geology, mapping, hydrology, biology, and related sciences; evaluate hazards associated with floods, droughts, hurricanes, subsidence, human activity, and climate change; map the onshore and offshore geologic framework; assess mineral resources and develop techniques for their discovery; assess water resources and develop an understanding of the impact of human activities and natural phenomena on hydrologic systems; assess links between biodiversity, habitat condition, ecosystem processes and health; and develop new technologies for collection and interpretation of earth science data.

National Geomagnetism Program 
The USGS National Geomagnetism Program monitors the magnetic field at magnetic observatories and distributes magnetometer data in real time.

North American Environmental Atlas 
The USGS collaborates with Canadian and Mexican government scientists, along with the Commission for Environmental Cooperation, to produce the North American Environmental Atlas, which is used to depict and track environmental issues for a continental perspective.

Streamgaging 

The USGS operates the streamgaging network for the United States, with over 7400 streamgages. Real-time streamflow data are available online.

Water Resources Research Institute 
As part of the Water Resources Research Act of 1984, the State Water Resources Research Act Program created a Water Resources Research Institute (WRRI) in each state, along with Washington DC, Puerto Rico, the US Virgin Islands, and Guam. Together, these institutes make up the National Institutes for Water Resources (NIWR). The institutes focus on water-related issues through research, training and collaboration.

Climate Adaptation Science Centers 
The National and regional Climate Adaptation Science Centers (CASCs) is a partnership-driven program that teams scientific researchers with natural and cultural resource managers to help fish, wildlife, waters, and lands across the country adapt to climate change. The National CASC (NCASC), based at USGS headquarters in Reston, Virginia, serves as the national office for the CASC network, while eight regional CASCs made up of federal-university consortiums located across the U.S., U.S. Pacific Islands, and U.S. Caribbean deliver science that addresses resource management priorities of the states within their footprints.

Astrogeology 
Since 1962, the Astrogeology Research Program has been involved in global, lunar, and planetary exploration and mapping.

Geochronology 
In collaboration with Stanford University, the USGS also operates the USGS-Stanford Ion Microprobe Laboratory, a world-class analytical facility for U-(Th)-Pb geochronology and trace element analyses of minerals and other earth materials.

National Streamflow Information Program 
USGS operates a number of water-related programs, notably the National Streamflow Information Program and National Water-Quality Assessment Program. USGS Water data is publicly available from their National Water Information System database.

National Wildlife Health Center 
The USGS also operates the National Wildlife Health Center, whose mission is "to serve the nation and its natural resources by providing sound science and technical support, and to disseminate information to promote science-based decisions affecting wildlife and ecosystem health. The NWHC provides information, technical assistance, research, education, and leadership on national and international wildlife health issues." It is the agency primarily responsible for surveillance of H5N1 avian influenza outbreaks in the United States. The USGS also runs 17 biological research centers in the United States, including the Patuxent Wildlife Research Center.

ShakeMaps 
The USGS is investigating collaboration with the social networking site Twitter to allow for more rapid construction of ShakeMaps. ShakeMaps are an interactive tool allowing users to visually observe the distribution and severity of Shaking resulting from Earthquakes.

Select activities

Topographic mapping

The USGS produces several national series of topographic maps which vary in scale and extent, with some wide gaps in coverage, notably the complete absence of 1:50,000 scale topographic maps or their equivalent. The largest (both in terms of scale and quantity) and best-known topographic series is the 7.5-minute, 1:24,000 scale, quadrangle, a non-metric scale virtually unique to the United States. Each of these maps covers an area bounded by two lines of latitude and two lines of longitude spaced 7.5 minutes apart. Nearly 57,000 individual maps in this series cover the 48 contiguous states, Hawaii, U.S. territories, and areas of Alaska near Anchorage, Fairbanks, and Prudhoe Bay. The area covered by each map varies with the latitude of its represented location due to convergence of the meridians. At 49° north latitude,  are contained within a quadrangle of that size. As a unique non-metric map scale, the 1:24,000 scale naturally requires a separate and specialized romer scale for plotting map positions. In recent years, budget constraints have forced the USGS to rely on donations of time by civilian volunteers in an attempt to update its 7.5-minute topographic map series, and USGS stated outright in 2000 that the program was to be phased out in favor of The National Map (not to be confused with the National Atlas of the United States produced by the Department of the Interior, one of whose bureaus is USGS).

An older series of maps, the 15-minute series, was once used to map the contiguous 48 states at a scale of 1:62,500 for maps covering the continental United States, but was discontinued during the last quarter of the twentieth century. Each map was bounded by two parallels and two meridians spaced 15 minutes apart—the same area covered by four maps in the 7.5-minute series. The 15-minute series, at a scale of 1:63,360 (one inch representing one mile), remains the primary topographic quadrangle for the state of Alaska (and only for that particular state). Nearly 3,000 maps cover 97% of the state. The United States remains virtually the only developed country in the world without a standardized civilian topographic map series in the standard 1:25,000 or 1:50,000 metric scales, making coordination difficult in border regions (the U.S. military does issue 1:50,000 scale topo maps of the continental United States, though only for use by members of its defense forces).

The next-smallest topographic series, in terms of scale, is the 1:100,000 series. These maps are bounded by two lines of longitude and two lines of latitude. However, in this series, the lines of latitude are spaced 30 minutes apart and the lines of longitude are spaced 60 minutes, which is the source of another name for these maps; the 30 x 60-minute quadrangle series. Each of these quadrangles covers the area contained within 32 maps in the 7.5-minute series. The 1:100,000 scale series is unusual in that it primarily employs the metric system. One centimeter on the map represents one kilometer of distance on the ground. Contour intervals, spot elevations, and horizontal distances are also specified in meters.

The final regular quadrangle series produced by the USGS is the 1:250,000 scale topographic series. Each of these quadrangles in the conterminous United States measures 1 degree of latitude by 2 degrees of longitude. Hawaii is mapped at this scale in quadrangles measuring 1° by 1°.

USGS topographic quadrangle maps are marked with grid lines and tics around the map collar which make it possible to identify locations on the map by several methods, including the graticule measurements of longitude and latitude, the township and section method within the Public Land Survey System, and cartesian coordinates in both the State Plane Coordinate System and the Universal Transverse Mercator coordinate system.

Other specialty maps have been produced by the USGS at a variety of scales. These include county maps, maps of special interest areas, such as the national parks, and areas of scientific interest.

A number of Internet sites have made these maps available on the web for affordable commercial and professional use. Because works of the U.S. government are in the public domain, it is also possible to find many of these maps for free at various locations on the Internet. Georeferenced map images are available from the USGS as digital raster graphics (DRGs) in addition to digital data sets based on USGS maps, notably digital line graphs (DLGs) and digital elevation models (DEMs).

In 2015, the USGS unveiled the topoView website, a new way to view their entire digitized collection of over 178,000 maps from 1884 to 2006. The site is an interactive map of the United States that allows users to search or move around the map to find the USGS collection of maps for a specific area. Users may then view the maps in great detail and download them if desired.

The National Map and U.S. Topo
In 2008 the USGS abandoned traditional methods of surveying, revising, and updating topographic maps based on aerial photography and field checks.  Today's U.S. Topo quadrangle (1:24,000) maps are mass-produced, using automated and semiautomated processes, with cartographic content supplied from the National GIS Database. In the two years from June 2009 to May 2011, the USGS produced nearly 40,000 maps, more than 80 maps per work day. Only about two hours of interactive work are spent on each map, mostly on text placement and final inspection; there are essentially no field checks or field inspections to confirm map details.

While much less expensive to compile and produce, the revised digital U.S. topo maps have been criticized for a lack of accuracy and detail in comparison to older generation maps based on aerial photo surveys and field checks. As the digital databases were not designed for producing general-purpose maps, data integration can be a problem when retrieved from sources with different resolutions and collection dates.  Man-made features once recorded by direct field observation are not in any public domain national database and are frequently omitted from the newest generation digital topo maps, including windmills, mines and mineshafts, water tanks, fence lines, survey marks, parks, recreational trails, buildings, boundaries, pipelines, telephone lines, power transmission lines, and even railroads.  Additionally, the digital map's use of existing software may not properly integrate different feature classes or prioritize and organize text in areas of crowded features, obscuring important geographic details.  As a result, some have noted that the U.S. Topo maps currently fall short of traditional topographic map presentation standards achieved in maps drawn from 1945  to 1992.

USGS Hydrologic Instrumentation Facility 
The Hydrologic Instrumentation Facility (HIF) has four sections within its organizational structure; the Field Services Section which includes the warehouse, repair shop, and Engineering Unit; the Testing Section which includes the Hydraulic Laboratory, testing chambers, and Water Quality Laboratory; the Information Technology Section which includes computer support and the Drafting Unit; and the Administrative Section.

The HIF was given national responsibility for the design, testing, evaluation, repair, calibration, warehousing, and distribution of hydrologic instrumentation. Distribution is accomplished by direct sales and through a rental program. The HIF supports data collection activities through centralized warehouse and laboratory facilities. The HIF warehouse provides hydrologic instruments, equipment, and supplies for USGS as well as Other Federal Agencies (OFA) and USGS Cooperators. The HIF also tests, evaluates, repairs, calibrates, and develops hydrologic equipment and instruments. The HIF Hydraulic Laboratory facilities include a towing tank, jet tank, pipe flow facility, and tilting flume. In addition, the HIF provides training and technical support for the equipment it stocks.

The Engineering Group seeks out new technology and designs for instrumentation that can work more efficiently, be more accurate, and or be produced at a lower cost than existing instrumentation. HIF works directly with vendors to help them produce products that will meet the mission needs of the USGS. For instrument needs not currently met by a vendor, the Engineering Group designs, tests, and issues contracts to have HIF-designed equipment made. Sometimes HIF will patent a new design in the hope that instrument vendors will buy the rights and mass-produce the instrument at a lower cost to everyone.

USGS publications

USGS researchers publish the results of their science in a variety of ways, including peer-reviewed scientific journals as well as in one of a variety of USGS Report Series that include preliminary results, maps, data, and final results. A complete catalog of all USGS publications is available from the USGS Publications Warehouse.

History 

Prompted by a report from the National Academy of Sciences, the USGS was created, by a last-minute amendment, to an act of Congress on March 3, 1879. It was charged with the "classification of the public lands, and examination of the geological structure, mineral resources, and products of the national domain". This task was driven by the need to inventory the vast lands added to the United States by the Louisiana Purchase in 1803 and the Mexican–American War in 1848.

The legislation also provided that the Hayden, Powell, and Wheeler surveys be discontinued as of June 30, 1879.

Clarence King, the first director of USGS, assembled the new organization from disparate regional survey agencies. After a short tenure, King was succeeded in the director's chair by John Wesley Powell.

List of USGS directors

 1879–1881: Clarence King
 1881–1894: John Wesley Powell
 1894–1907: Charles Doolittle Walcott
 1907–1930: George Otis Smith
 1930–1943: Walter Curran Mendenhall
 1943–1956: William Embry Wrather
 1956–1965: Thomas Brennan Nolan
 1965–1971: William Thomas Pecora
 1971–1978: Vincent Ellis McKelvey
 1978–1981: Henry William Menard
 1981–1993: Dallas Lynn Peck
 1994–1997: Gordon P. Eaton
 1998–2005: Charles G. Groat
 2006–2009: Mark Myers
 2009–2013: Marcia McNutt
 2014–2017: Suzette Kimball
 2018–2021: James F. Reilly
 2022–present: David Applegate

See also 

 Alaska Volcano Observatory
 California earthquake forecast
 Cascades Volcano Observatory
 Core Research Center
 Geographic Names Information System
 Hawaiian Volcano Observatory
 List of national mapping agencies
 National Lidar Dataset (United States)
 QuakeSim
 Timeline of environmental history
 Variscale ruler
 Volcano Disaster Assistance Program
 Water Resource Region

References

Footnotes

External links 

USGS in the Federal Register
Open-File reports online

Mytopo historical maps hosts historical USGS topos in the northeast U.S.
U.S. Geological Survey Documents at Texas Tech University 1873–2015
Historic technical reports from USGS (and other Federal agencies) are available in the Technical Report Archive and Image Library (TRAIL)
Historic American Buildings Survey (HABS) documentation, filed under 2255 North Gemini Drive, Flagstaff, Coconino County, AZ:

 
Geography organizations
Geological surveys
Geography of the United States
Geology of the United States
Climatological research
Exploration of North America
Maps of the United States
Scientific organizations based in the United States
United States Department of the Interior agencies
Government agencies established in 1879
Scientific organizations established in 1879
1879 establishments in Virginia
Environmental organizations based in California
San Mateo County, California
Environmental organizations based in Virginia
Reston, Virginia